Tun Ismail bin Mohamed Ali (16 September 1918 – 6 July 1998) was the second Governor of Bank Negara Malaysia and the chairman of the Pemodalan Nasional Berhad (PNB).

Life
Ismail was born on 16 September 1918 in Port Swettenham, Selangor and is the eldest brother in the family. He was of Minangkabau descent from Rao, West Sumatera.

He is the brother of a number of famous figures such as Tan Sri Muhammad Hashim Mohamad Ali  (former Chief of the Armed Forces), Tan Sri Ahmad Razali Mohamad Ali (former Menteri Besar of Selangor), Abdul Aziz Mohamad Ali (former chairman of MARA), Datuk Jaffhar Mohamad Ali, Siti Hasmah Mohamad Ali, and Datin Shalleha Muhammad Ali. He is also the brother in-law of Former Malaysian Prime Minister Mahathir Mohamad.

Education
Ismail received his early education at the Malay School and Victoria Institution (VI), Kuala Lumpur from 1931 to 1938. He was active in Scouts, swimming, badminton and gardening. He is prefect of Shaw House. He is the second Malay student in the country won its competitive  Queen's Scholarship. He studied economics at the University of Cambridge (1938-1941). He was stranded in England as a result of the Second World War and continued to learn his law studies in 1943 at the Inns of Court in London, Middle Temple and became a lawyer after that.

Career
Ismail returned to Malaya / Malaya after the war in 1946. Tun Ismail joined the Malayan Civil Service; Assistant Secretary of State Government (1948) - one of the first non-European officers recruited directly into the MCS. In 1920, the British Secretary of State accepts that services should be recognized throughout Malaya. Services Malayan Civil Service was formally adopted in January 1921 with the creation of 183 posts. Candidates for the position must be a " natural born British subjects of pure European descent on both sides ". The number of Malay officers in the MCS on 11 November 1946 during the Malayan Union is 21 out of the total strength of 230 officers MCS .

He has served as Assistant Secretary in the Economics Department of the Treasury; economic officials in Andhra Pradesh, India; Guard in the Department of Commerce Ministry of Commerce and Industry; at the Malaysian Embassy in Washington DC (1957-1960); Executive Director of the International Bank for Reconstruction and Development (IBRD) in the United States .
Upon his return to Malaya in 1960, he was appointed Deputy Governor of the Central Bank and the Governor of the National Bank (26 July 1962). He held the post for 18 years until 26 July 1980 .

He was influential on planning and directing the historic 'Dawn Raid' attack of buying Guthrie's shares in London Stock Exchange in September 1981.

After retiring
Ismail involved in the Malaysian Industrial Development Finance Berhad ; Permodalan Nasional Berhad, Golden Hope Plantations Berhad and Sime Darby Berhad. He is Pro - Chancellor of Universiti Kebangsaan Malaysia and the board of directors of the Victoria Institution, Kuala Lumpur.

Governor of Bank Negara Malaysia
Throughout his stint as the second Governor of Bank Negara Malaysia, he has constantly improved the pristine of the country's banking system as well as to establish it as an emerging force and had helped garner respect from the world's over. He was the Governor of Bank Negara Malaysia; Malaysia's Central Bank, from 1962 to 1980, once a new record as longest-serving governor of a central bank in Asia .

Death
Ismail died on 6 July 1998 at the age of 79 in Ampang, Selangor due to Influenza. He was buried at the Jalan Ampang Muslim Cemetery, Kuala Lumpur.

Honours

Honours of Malaysia
  : 
 Commander of the Order of the Defender of the Realm (PMN) – Tan Sri (1964)
 Grand Commander of the Order of Loyalty to the Crown of Malaysia (SSM) – Tun (1980)
  :
  Knight Grand Commander of the Order of the Crown of Selangor (SPMS) – Dato' Seri (1977)

Places named after him
In Kuala Lumpur, there is a building named Menara Tun Ismail Mohd Ali at Jalan Raja Laut which was named after him in 2003.

References

1918 births
1998 deaths
20th-century Malaysian businesspeople
Commanders of the Order of the Defender of the Realm
Governors of the Central Bank of Malaysia
Grand Commanders of the Order of Loyalty to the Crown of Malaysia
Malaysian bankers
Malaysian Muslims
Malaysian people of Malay descent
Malaysian people of Minangkabau descent
Knights Grand Commander of the Order of the Crown of Selangor